Bolex Dementia is the second and final album by the 1970s British rock band Hard Stuff.

During the recording of the album, two members of the band (John Cann and Paul Hammond), were injured in a serious car accident in Belgium. Cann had been sitting in the front passenger seat of their Ford Zodiac and suffered an injured back and broken ribs, while Hammond, who had been asleep in the back seat, broke both his legs. Cann spent a week in hospital in Ostend, and Hammond two months.

The band managed to finish recording Bolex Dementia, but Cann later stated, "When I listen to it, it sounds a little patchy and not how we intended it to be... It still has its good moments but it's a shame it all happened the way it did."

Hard Stuff split shortly after the release of the album, and the members went their separate ways. After declining to rejoin Atomic Rooster, Cann briefly joined Thin Lizzy before recording a solo album, The World's Not Big Enough. Gustafson joined Roxy Music and later the Ian Gillan Band, while Hammond continued to recover from his injuries before working with Cann on his solo album.

Track listing

Side 1
"Roll a Rocket" (John Cann) – 5:19
"Libel" (John Gustafson) – 3:58
"Ragman" (Gustafson) – 3:01
"Spider's Web" (Cann) – 4:55
"Get Lost" (Cann) – 3:01

Side 2
"Sick n' Tired" (Cann) – 4:04
"Mermany" (Gustafson) – 5:58
"Jumpin' Thumpin' (Ain't That Somethin')" (Cann) – 2:55
"Dazzle Dizzy" (Gustafson) – 3:41
"Bolex Dementia" (Gustafson) – 3:41

CD bonus tracks
"Inside Your Life" (Gustafson) – 3:04
"(It's) How You Do It" (Cann) – 3:04

Notes
The US pressing of the album reversed the sides, and some later CD releases reversed the track listing so that Side 2 came before Side 1, and "Sick 'n' Tired" was the opening track.
Later releases showed John Cann's name as John Du Cann, as he later became known by this name.

Personnel
John Cann – guitar, cello, vocals
John Gustafson – bass guitar, keyboards, vocals
Paul Hammond – drums, percussion
Engineer – Louie Austin
Produced by Hard Stuff
Mastering – Gilbert Kong
Cover painting – István Sándorfi; US pressing – John Charles Youssi
Photography – Fin Costello
Art direction – Sheila Green

References

Hard Stuff albums
1973 albums
Purple Records albums
Mercury Records albums
Angel Air albums